Jajmau also known as Jajesmow during British Era, is a suburb of Kanpur, India. It is situated on the banks of the Ganges River. Jajmau is an industrial suburb. It has the population of about 652,831 according to census 2011. It is believed to be the oldest inhabited place in the region. The main industry is the leather industry. It is home to some of the biggest leather tanneries in Northern India. The excavations conducted here by the Archaeological Survey of India suggest that it dates back to c. 1300 – 1200 BCE. Earthen pottery, tools and various historical artifacts discovered by the Archaeological Survey of India are presently kept in the Kanpur Sangrahalaya. The area comes under the jurisdiction of Kanpur metropolitan area.

Geography

The city's coordinates are 26.4670° North and 80.3500° East, placing it 83 km from Lucknow. Jajmau is situated near the Ganges. It has one big market named Lal Bangla. Water comes from Jajmau City by Defence Colony water tank and there are various pumping stations for providing water. The sub metro area of 40 km2 extends from Bibipur in the south to Chandar Nagar in the north and Ramadevi in the east to Jajmau extension in the west. There are many major roads.

Flora and fauna

Jajmau is home to many trees, including mango, orange, guava and banana which are mainly found in a suburb of the city at a nursery in Tagore Ave. The nursery can offer common plants found in India and flowers. The best place to see animals is Ahmed ka ghar Allen Forest Zoo or Kanpur Zoo at Nawabganj which is 20 km from town. The zoo offers a variety of animals to see.

History
It is home to most of the biggest leather industries in India generating 15000cr of revenues every year and accounting for 30% of Indian Export. While coming from Lucknow from the new the Ganges bridge you can see the old "Jinnaton ki Masjid" on top of the hill. It resembles the Taj Mahal due to its architecture and white colour. Going down the side of the hill opposite to the river is a settlement for nearly half a million people mostly involved in leather industry.

Going farther down from the uphill there is the famous shrine of Makhdoom Shah Ala based on which the areas is named as Makhdoom Nagar. Feroze Shah Tughlaq built the tomb of this famous Sufi saint in 1358. A mosque built by Kulich Khan in 1679 also stands here.

Also in the shrine there are two ancient carved inscribed stone tablets grafted in wall which are in Arabic and inform that Sultan Feroze Shah Tughlaq had visited the mausoleum and had the shrine built i.e. Mazar of Qazi Alaulhaq Waddeen Yusuf in the year 761 Hijri, and Masjid (mosque) inside the Dargah campus in 762 Hijri. Every Thursday many people of various religions assemble in the Dargah Sharif to seek blessings to succeed. Issueless and those having no male issue receive the most benefit. The ASI (Archaeological Survey of India) had photographed/copied the stone inscriptions of Dargah Makhdoom Shah Ala of years 761 and 762 Hijri and also from Dargah Dadamiyan (Qazi Sirajul Haq Waddeen the father of Makhdoom Aala) a contemporary of Sultan Qutbuddeen Aibak (1192 AD to 1210 AD) of year 696 Hijri in the campus Eidgaah and published the same with their findings in their book Epigraphia Indica—Arabic & Persian Supplement 1964 with special reference to the Farman of Firoz Tuglaq with the Saint's direct descendants Qazi Haseen Ahmed Farooqi. Their descriptions are also found in many older books of History including Tareekhe Zila Kanpur (1876 AD), Kanpur Gazetteer 1909 and Kanpur ka Itihas Page 306 to 310. Mr. Qazi Haseen Ahmed is succeeded by his two sons Mr. Qazi Sabeeh Ahmed & Mr. Wajih Ahmed.

The archaeological site of Jajmau is a huge mound situated on the banks of Ganges river, known as the Jajmau ka tila. Copper hoard artefacts and Painted Grey Ware (PGW) sherds were found from the surface deposits of this mound. In 1956, at the time of the construction of the national highway and Jajamu bridge, remains of an ancient settlement were discovered here. Excavations were carried out by the Archaeological Survey of India and the Uttar Pradesh State Archaeology Department in 1956-58 and 1973-78. During the excavations carried out in 1977-78, an ivory seal with Vasalas inscribed in Brahmi was found. A historian, Girish Chandra Singh, claimed that Vasalas is an epithet of Chandragupta Maurya.

In 2006, during widening of the national highway, a salvage operation was started to document and study the archaeological remains embedded within a portion of the mound by a team of archaeologists led by Ram Vinay under the direction of Uttar Pradesh State Archaeological Directorate. During the excavation, the Black and Red Wares were discovered here below the PGW layer. Significant archaeological findings from this site during this excavation include a hoard of silver punch-marked coins in a NBPW vase with a lustrous polish, a baked terracotta dabber bearing Brahmi inscription of c. 3rd–2nd century BCE and structures made of mud and baked bricks of Mauryan and pre-Mauryan period. The symbols of sun, crescent, tree within a vedika and hill are found in these coins. The inscription on the terracotta dabber in Brahmi is in two lines. The first line has been deciphered as bha di ke (Bhadrike) and a single letter, ma in dots is inscribed below it. Radiocarbon dates found by the Birbal Sahni Institute of Palaeobotany for the charcoal samples collected from this deposit during this excavation, cultural material and stratigraphy suggest that this part of the mound was settled from c. 1300 – 1200 BCE.

Downtown
The major economical hub 'Downtown' Lal Bungla is situated in the heart of the city. It has many shops and plazas. The area is of 6 km sq. and has a population of about 20,000.

Climate

The climate of Jajmau is hot in summer and warm in winters. Jajmau experiences heavy fog in December and January, resulting in massive traffic and travel delays. Rains appear between July and September, almost at the end of the regular monsoon season. Some rainfall is recorded during the harvest season of March–April. These extremes however, give the region an advantage of having three crops of versatile range of products.

Transport

Roadways
The roads NH 25 and NH 2 pass nearby to Jajmau. It also has bus station named Jajmau Bus station. Jajmau is 80 km from lucknow and 210 km from Allahabad.

Road

The four routes of city buses are:
Purani Chungi (Old Point) – Wazidpur
Nay Chungi (New Point) – Ramadevi Crossing
Krishnanagar North – Bibipur
Airforce Gate – Jagaipur
J.K. Colony – Jakhaibaba Chauraha (Kailash Nagar)

Note: Autos, rickshaws and tempos are available in all streets

Railways
Chakeri (8 km from centre) Railway Station and Kanpur Central (10 km from centre) railway station serves the town. Kanpur Metro project (planned) is planned to be made by 2020 will serve the town with Ramadevi station connecting it to Kanpur Airport, ISBT Jhakarkatti, IIT Kanpur and Kanpur Cantonment.

Airways
The Chakeri Airport is situated near Jajmau. Flights for various metro cities across India are operated regularly.

Tourist attractions

Siddhnath Ghat
1000 Tanneries in Industrial Estate Jajmau

Places of interest

Parks and Stadias
Narendra Stadium
Air Force Complex Stadium
Center Ground
Joseph Park

Theatres
Poonam Cinemas (closed)
Majum Cinemas (closed)

Health care
The Municipality of Jajmau area has developed a new hospital in Lal Bangla area. Many private hospitals, eye care centres and clinics are also present here. Chaudhary Ehsan Karim Hospital, Dey's Hospital, Bima Hospital and Raksha Hospital are major hospitals in this area which are privately run.

Towns and localities
Parmat Tample
Lal Bungla
Defence Colony
Old Jajmau
New Jajmau (On either side of Ganges River In Unnao District)
Tannery Town
Wazidpur
J K Lyone Colony
Sector 1-15
Sector 2
Chhabile Purwa
Gajju Purwa
KDA Colony (Ganga Vihar Colony)
Rural Jajmau (near Purani Chungi or Old Crossing)
Pokharpur
Pardewanpur
Gaushala
Rameshwaram Dham
Chander Nagar
Harjinder Nagar
Viman Nagar
Bibipur
Air Force
Jagai Purwa
Greater Kailash (Anglo Indians=45%, South Indians=55%)
Kailash Nagar
Shivkatra

Religious and cultural center

Religion

Jajmau is famous for Parmat temple of lord Shiva, which is situated in banks of Ganges. Also Jajmau is a religious and cultural centre for Muslims. Many mosques and madrasas are present here. Jajmau is the second-largest city in Uttar Pradesh with a large Muslim population. About 60% of people are Muslims, the other 35% are Hindus and the rest 5% are Christians, Sikhs and Atheists.

People
Jajmau's population mainly consists of the people from eastern Uttar Pradesh which has 75% of population. The major proportion of Jajmau is acquired by people of Eastern Uttar Pradesh. The people from local areas (Kanpur, Unnao, Fatehpur, Hamirpur, Kannauj, Akbarpur) and Central U.P. percentage is 10%. The people from South India are about 2% and people from Punjab consists of about 10% and Anglo Indians are 2%. Rest 1% are from eastern, western, and northern Indian states.

Streets
There are many small streets in Jajmau. The main street is Western Sub-Metropolitan Bypass on which the Jajmau Downtown is situated which connects it to Kanpur Cantonment and Kanpur Downtown. Some other main streets are-
Greater Kailash Ave (Main Road of Greater Kailash)
Western Sub Metropolitan Bypass (Chakeri Road Harjinder Nagar Crossing-Chandar Nagar)
Ashiana Ave (Road near Ashiana Colony)
Jajmau Road (Old Chungi-NH 25)
Shivkatra Road (NH 2-150 FEET ROAD)
150 Feet Road (Old Chungi-New Chungi)
South Street (New Chungi-Wazidpur)

High rise structures

A selection of the tallest buildings in Jajmau are listed below. Other tall structures include the Pokhapore Tower, the Ashiana buildings at J K Colony and the Army Buildings.

Sister cities
 Hebron, Palestine

Notes

External links
 Blog and maps
http://www.alexmasi.co.uk/gallery_2.php?id=14&choice=intro&image_id=702&imgid=2&counter=1 

Neighbourhoods in Kanpur
Archaeological sites in Uttar Pradesh
Cities and towns in Kanpur Nagar district